Galeazzo Visconti was an envoy who represented Ludovico Sforza, the deposed Duke of Milan, at the negotiations for the Treaty of Basel (1499).

References

15th-century Italian politicians
Galeazzo (envoy)

Medieval Italian diplomats
Year of death unknown
Year of birth unknown
15th-century diplomats